NGC 440 is a spiral galaxy of type SA(s)bc pec located in the constellation Tucana. It was discovered on September 27, 1834 by John Herschel. It was described by Dreyer as "faint, very small, round."

References

External links
 

0440
18340927
Tucana (constellation)
Unbarred spiral galaxies
004361